The Accused is a 2018 Argentine crime-thriller film directed by Gonzalo Tobal. It premiered at the 75th Venice International Film Festival on 4 September and was released in Argentina on 13 September by Warner Bros. Pictures. The film has received critical acclaim, with praise for Lali Espósito's performance.

Plot
Dolores lived the life of a higher-class student until her best friend was found brutally murdered. Two years later, she’s the only indicted suspect for a crime that attracts a lot of media attention and has placed her in the center of the public eye.

Dolores spends her days preparing for the trial, secluded in her house as her parents work as a team ready to do anything to defend their daughter. The best lawyer is not enough, they obsessively control around her: how she looks, what she does, eats and who she sees.

But as the trial moves forward and pressure grows, suspicion and secrets emerge within the family. Cornered, increasingly isolated and just when any mistake could prove disastrous, Dolores puts the entire strategy at risk.

Cast
 Lali Espósito as Dolores Dreier
 Leonardo Sbaraglia as Luis Dreier, Dolores' father
 Inés Estévez as Betina Dreier, Dolores' mother
 Daniel Fanego as Ignacio Larocca, Dolores' lawyer
 Gerardo Romano as Dr. Taboada, a public prosecutor
 Emilio Vodanovich as Martin Dreier, Dolores' younger brother
 Martina Campos as Flo, Dolores' friend
 Lautaro Rodriguez as Lucas, Dolores' friend and lover
 Gael García Bernal as Mario Elmo, a popular talk-show host
 Ana Garibaldi as Marisa Nieves, the victim's mother
 Daniel Campomenosi as Rodolfo, the victim's stepfather

Release
The Accused had its world premiere on 4 September 2018 at the 75th Venice International Film Festival, where it was selected as one of twenty-one films to compete for the Golden Lion award. In the following months, the film also screened at multiple film festivals, including the 2018 Toronto International Film Festival, the 23rd Busan International Film Festival, and Morelia International Film Festival, and the Miami International Film Festival. The film was released in Argentina on 13 September by Warner Bros. Pictures, and eventually in France, Greece, Mexico, Serbia and Uruguay.

Reception
On review aggregator website Rotten Tomatoes, The Accused holds an approval rating of  based on  reviews. On Argentine review aggregator website Todas Las Críticas, the film has a weighted average score of 68 out of 100, based on 38 positive and 5 negative critics.

Jay Weissberg of Variety gave the film a positive review, saying "[The Accused] is solid, straightforward storytelling, certain to do well in Spanish-speaking territories and perhaps beyond." He also singled out Espósito's performance, saying "[she] refuses to cater to expectations, resulting in a performance of unexpected ambiguity, more sensed than spelled out." In his review for Screen International, Stephen Witty described it as "a quietly engrossing drama [...] of slowly dawning discoveries", and commented on Fernando Lockett's cinematography, calling it "intimate, close-up and even, occasionally, claustrophobic." Cinema Scope's Diego Brodersen highlighted Espósito's performance, saying that "[she] is quite convincing as the main character: in some instances, she seems fragile; at other times, manipulative traits surface, and with them the possibility that she could be a very good liar."

Accolades

References

External links
 

2018 films
2018 crime thriller films
2010s Spanish-language films
Argentine crime thriller films
Films shot in Buenos Aires
Warner Bros. films
2010s Argentine films